Region 3 or Region III can refer to:

 One of the DVD region codes
 Region 3, Northwest Territories (Canadian census)
The South of the US (American census)
 One of health regions of Canada managed by Horizon Health Network
 Former Region 3 (Johannesburg), an administrative district in the city of Johannesburg, South Africa, from 2000 to 2006
 One of Regions of Iran, commonly known as Azerbaijan (Iran)
Atacama Region, Chile
Central Luzon, Philippines

Region name disambiguation pages